Southerham Machine Bottom Pit is a  geological Site of Special Scientific Interest in Lewes in the East Sussex. It is a Geological Conservation Review site.

This site is historically significant for the number and quality of fossils of Cretaceous fish found by nineteenth century scholars such as Gideon Mantell. These fossils are particularly important for helping to understand the early evolution of fish groups such as the teleosts.

The site is private land with no public access.

References

Sites of Special Scientific Interest in East Sussex
Geological Conservation Review sites
Glynde